
'''This page is out of date and should be considered an historic reference only

The UK Dispersion Modelling Bureau was part of the Met Office, the UK's national weather and meteorological service. The meteorologists in the bureau are among the UK's leading experts in areas such:

 meteorology
 air quality studies and forecasting
 air pollution dispersion modelling
 industrial emissions

Consultancy services
The bureau consisted of a team of air quality specialists dedicated to providing advice, support, and consultancy service to industry, government, local authorities and private consultants. The team had particular expertise with long and short range atmospheric pollution dispersion modelling using the NAME, AERMOD, ADMS, BOXURB and other dispersion models.

The bureau's consultancy services included:

 height assessments of industrial stacks discharging airborne pollutants
 long-term environmental impact studies of airborne pollutant emissions
 scenario modelling and analyses of accidental releases of airborne pollutants
 Air pollution forecasting studies
 studies of long-range trans-boundary transport of air pollutants 
 urban air quality modelling
 providing site-specific meteorological data

The Met Office continues to conduct atmospheric dispersion and air quality research and provides a range of services to UK and international governmental bodies, research funds and commercial customers.

See also

Accidental release source terms
Bibliography of atmospheric dispersion modelling
Air pollution dispersion terminology
Air Quality Modeling Group
Air Resources Laboratory
AP 42 Compilation of Air Pollutant Emission Factors
Atmospheric dispersion modelling
Atmospheric Studies Group
List of atmospheric dispersion models
UK Atmospheric Dispersion Modelling Liaison Committee

References

Further reading
 www.crcpress.com
 www.air-dispersion.com

External links
 UK Dispersion Modelling Bureau web site
 UK Atmospheric Dispersion Modelling Liaison Committee (ADMLC) web site
 Air Resources Laboratory (ARL)
 Air Quality Modeling Group
 Met Office web site
 Error propagation in air dispersion modelling

Air pollution in the United Kingdom
Air pollution organizations
Atmospheric dispersion modeling
Governmental meteorological agencies in Europe
Met Office